The Yamaha YZF-R6 is a sport bike, produced by Yamaha as a 600 class from 1999 to 2020. From 2021, production availability is limited to race-only specification in most global markets, causing race organisers to re-align their engine eligibility criteria to encourage other manufacturers having larger than 600 cc displacements to enter road-race competition from 2022. Race organisers wanted to provide scope for alternative machinery to move away from established tradition of the Yamaha R6 being the dominant marque in Supersport racing.

History 
The YZF-R6 was introduced in 1999 as the super sport version of YZF-R1 super bike, and as a companion to the more street-oriented YZF600R sport bike which continued to be sold alongside the R6. The motorcycle featured Yamaha's completely new engine design capable of producing over  while stationary.

The YZF-R6 has been revised several times since its introduction. Starting with the 2003 model, when the R6 became fuel-injected. The 2006 model year was a significant upgrade with a new engine management system featuring the YCC-T ride by wire throttle and a multi-plate slipper clutch. The 2008 model incorporated the YCC-I variable-length intake system to optimize power at high engine rpm and an improved Deltabox frame design.

2006 tachometer problem
In 2006, Yamaha advertised that the R6 had a redline of 17,500 rpm. This is 2,000 rpm higher than the previous R6 model and was the highest tachometer redline of any 2006 production four-stroke motorcycle engine. The true maximum engine speed was limited by the ECU to 15,800 RPM. In February 2006, Yamaha admitted the bike's true engine redline was more than 1,000 rpm lower than what was indicated on the tachometer and had been advertised, and offered to buy back any R6 if the customer was unhappy.

Motorsport
Chaz Davies helped Yamaha to win both the riders and manufacturers title during the 2011 Supersport World Championship season. The bike also won the supersport category at the 2008 North West 200 Races.

2017 update
The updated R6 has improved aerodynamics with styling inspired by the R1 as well as its 43mm inverted front fork and front brakes, new rear shock, a new aluminum fuel tank, magnesium subframe, ABS brakes, riding modes, and traction control. The new aerodynamics are claimed to reduce drag by 8% over previous models. The engine is unchanged with rear wheel power still at about 120 hp. Body is similar to MotoGPs 2005– YZR-M1.

The 2017 update comes with an OBD port. Unlike previous models, this R6 does not have the same diagnostic mode option. In order to retrieve the diagnostic codes, an adapter that plugs into any OBD-II scanner is needed.

Specifications

Notes

References
 Yamaha Offers To Buy Back YZF-R6 Streetbikes Over Redline Claims Road Racing World
 Yamaha R-Series 10th anniversary site Descriptions of all Yamaha R-series bikes up to 2008 models
 Yamaha R6 review Road tests of every Yamaha R6 model since 1998
 Yamaha R6 Year-model comparison

External links

 

YZF-R6
Sport bikes
Motorcycles introduced in 1998